The 2002–03 Allsvenskan season was the fourth season of the Allsvenskan, the second level of ice hockey in Sweden. 24 teams participated in the league, and Hammarby IF, Rögle BK, AIK, and Skellefteå AIK qualified for the Elitserien qualifier (Swedish: Kvalserien), with Hammarby finishing in first place in SuperAllsvenskan.

Regular season

Northern Group

Southern Group

SuperAllsvenskan

Qualification round

Northern Group

Gruppe Süd

Playoffs

First round 
 IF Sundsvall Hockey - AIK 0:2 (1:2, 1:2)
 Mörrums GoIS IK - IF Björklöven 0:2 (2:3, 3:5)
 IFK Arboga IK - Bofors IK 2:0 (3:2 OT, 5:2)
 Huddinge IK - Skellefteå AIK 0:2 (1:4, 1:4)

Second round 
 AIK - IF Björklöven 2:0 (4:2, 3:2)
 IFK Arboga IK - Skellefteå AIK 1:2 (3:2, 2:10, 2:4)

Relegation round

Northern Group 

Kiruna IF did not participate to the relegation round due to financial problems, and were relegated to the Swedish Division 1.

Southern Group

Kvalserien

External links 
 Season on passionhockey.com

Swe
HockeyAllsvenskan seasons
2